Max Niederbacher (22 June 1899 – June 1979) was a German international footballer.

References

1899 births
1979 deaths
Association football midfielders
German footballers
Germany international footballers
Stuttgarter Kickers players